Francis John Murphy (16 August 1949 – 23 October 1970) was a Scottish professional footballer who played  as a left half in the Football League for Notts County.

References
General
 . Retrieved 20 October 2013.
Specific

1949 births
1970 deaths
Footballers from Edinburgh
Scottish footballers
Association football wing halves
Notts County F.C. players
Penicuik Athletic F.C. players
English Football League players